Gloucestershire Cup was the informal name of an association football competition held under the auspices of the Gloucestershire County Football Association on 99 occasions from 1887 to 1996. The full name of the competition changed over time: originally the Gloucestershire Football Association Challenge Cup, the introduction of a Junior tournament two years later led to it being renamed the Gloucestershire Football Association Senior Challenge Cup in 1889, then after the advent of professionalism in football it became the Gloucestershire Senior Professional Cup.

It was originally a knockout tournament open to teams in Gloucestershire, but from 1907–08 became an annual match between the first teams of Bristol Rovers and Bristol City.

Creation

The Gloucestershire cup was created by Charles Lacy Sweet of Clifton Association F.C. after a meeting in September 1887. Present at the meeting were representatives from Clifton Association, Eastville Rovers (later to become Bristol Rovers), Globe (a team made up of Old Elizabethans), Southville, and church teams St Agnes, St George and St Simon.

The draw for the first edition of the competition was held at the Montpelier Hotel in Bristol on 5 October 1887 and featured seven entrants. Eastville Rovers were awarded a bye into the second round, while the first round ties drawn were Clifton v St Agnes, Globe v Southville, and Warmley v St George.

1887–88 tournament

Knockout tournament

List of tournament finals

 The cumulative number of cup wins for each team is shown in brackets.
 The title was shared between Bristol Rovers and Bristol City in 1901–02 after two matches were played and drawn.

Summary of tournament winners
It is arguable which team was the most successful of the tournament era. Bristol City's six wins and three runners-up places put them clearly ahead of any other team, but two of these wins and one second place came prior to their merger with Bedminster in 1900. The Western Daily Press at the time clearly considered the merged team to be a new club, distinct from the original, which would make Warmley the most successful team, with four wins and four second places.

Bristol City v Bristol Rovers matches
There was a growing feeling among teams participating in the tournament that the dominance shown by City and Rovers meant that all other entrants were going into the competition each year knowing that they had no hope of winning. A solution to this problem was put forward at the annual meeting of the Gloucestershire County Football Association (GFA), held at the Crown & Dove Hotel in central Bristol on 2 August 1907. Mr W.H. Haskins, secretary of the GFA, proposed the creation of an intermediate cup competition for teams who were too accomplished to take part in the Junior Cup, but who were unable to compete with Rovers and City in the Senior competition. The proposal carried with unanimous support in the room. From this point on the Senior Cup would be contested by Rovers and City only each year.

The change in the format of the competition coincided with a move from the final's traditional place in the calendar on Easter Monday, enabling more flexibility with the scheduling of matches.

The 1996 Gloucestershire Cup match was depicted in a series 5 episode of the ITV preschool series Rosie and Jim.

List of Bristol City v Bristol Rovers match results

 The 1908–09 final was held over to the beginning of the following season due to fixture congestion suffered by City.
 The 1986–87 final was held over to the following season.

Total Bristol City wins:  53
Total Bristol Rovers wins: 27

References

Bibliography

County Cup competitions
Football in Bristol
Football in Gloucestershire
Bristol Rovers F.C.
Bristol City F.C.
Recurring sporting events established in 1887
Recurring sporting events disestablished in 1996
Defunct football cup competitions in England
1887 establishments in England
1996 disestablishments in England